Torstein Lofthus (born 10 March 1977) is a Norwegian drummer and composer who has been a member of the bands Shining, Elephant9, the Mathias Eick Band, D'Sound, and Ebersson/Zanussi/Lofthus. He is married to Hege Lofthus.

Career

Lofthus has had a major influence on Norwegian music through studio work, live concerts and teaching at Norwegian Academy of Music and at University of Agder (the Faculty of Fine Arts). Based in Oslo, he now tours Norway and Europe with different bands and artists after finishing his master at the Norwegian Academy of Music spring 2006. He plays several genres, well known with both jazz and pop music. He has been the most sought drummer in Norway recent years, if not on tour with Vamp, Jarle Bernhoft, Oslo Gospel Choir, Mathias Eick or Marit Larsen, he collaborates with Maria Mena, Kurt Nilsen, Torun Eriksen, Bertine Zetlitz, Silje Nergaard, Eivind Aarset, D'Sound, Noora Noor, The Norwegian Radio Orchestra, Jon Eberson and Per Zanussi, to mention a few, both in studio and on stage.

He has worked with Shining, Elephant9, Red Kite, Marit Larsen, Maria Mena, Jarle Bernhoft, Chrome hill, Mathias Eick Band, D'Sound, Oslo Gospel Choir, Jørn Øien Trio, Liarbird, Torun Eriksen, Ebersson/Zanussi/Lofthus, Garness, Søyr, Morten Halle, Eivind Aarset, Silje Nergaard, Beady Belle, Damp, Bertine Zetlitz, Kurt Nilsen, Maria Solheim, and Papangu.

Awards and honors
2010: Spellemannprisen in the category Jazz for the album Walk the Nile with Elephant9
2011: Spellemannprisen as Innovator of the Year with Shining
2015: Gammleng-prisen in the category studio musician

Discography
Shining
 Blackjazz (2010)
 Grindstone (2007)
 In the Kingdom of Kitsch You Will Be a Monster (2005)
 Sweet Shanghai Devil (2003)
 Where the Ragged People Go (2002)

Elephant9
 Walk the Nile (2010)
 Dodovoodoo (2008)

Thom Hell
 All Good Things (2010)

Aleksander With
 Still Awake (2010)

Torun Eriksen
 Passage (2010) (1 song)
 Prayers & Observations (2005)
 Glittercard (2003)

Jørn Øien trio
 Digging in the Dark (2010)

Chrome Hill
 Earthlings (2008)

Damp
 Hoatzin (2005)
 Mostly Harmless (2003)

Mathias Eick
 Skala (2011)
 Ravensburg (2018)

Ola Kvernberg's Liarbird
Liarbird (Jazzland, 2011), the commissioned work, live from Moldejazz 2010 including Bergmund Waal Skaslien (viola), Eirik Hegdal (saxophone), Håkon Kornstad (saxophone), Mathias Eick (trumpet), Ingebrigt Håker Flaten and Ole Morten Vågan (bass), as well as Erik Nylander (drums)

Jarle Bernhoft
 Solidarity Breaks (2011)
 1: Man 2: Band (2010)

Marit Larsen
 Under the Surface (2006)
 The Chase (2008)

Garness
 Barnet i krybben (2009)
 The good or better side of things (2008)

Ebersson/Zanussi/Lofthus
 Bring it on (2006)

Silje Nergaard
 Darkness Out of Blue (2007)

Linn Skåber and Dennis Storhøi
  Petter Snus og vårmelodien (2007)

Maria Solheim
 Frail (2004)
 Behind Closed Doors (2002)

Rockettothesky
 To Sing You Apple Trees (2006)

Samsaya
 Shedding Skin (2004)

Gisle Torvik
 Naken Uten Gitar (1999)

Various artists
 Stolpesko (2002)

References

External links
 Damp
Torstein live with Shining at John Dee Concert Hall in Oslo

1977 births
Living people
Musicians from Kvam
Spellemannprisen winners
Norwegian rock drummers
Norwegian jazz drummers
Male drummers
20th-century Norwegian drummers
21st-century Norwegian drummers
20th-century drummers
20th-century Norwegian male musicians
21st-century Norwegian male musicians
Male jazz musicians
Shining (Norwegian band) members
Elephant9 members
Søyr members
Chrome Hill (band) members
RareNoiseRecords artists